Arya Senior Secondary School is a secondary school in Jhojhu Kalan, Haryana, India. The school is one of several operated in the region by the Maharishi Dayanand Education Society and was declared the best school among the non-government schools of Haryana in 2001-02.

History

Arya Senior Secondary School was founded in 1996 by Sh. Parmender Chitoria, Sh. Kuldeep Sangwan,  Sh. Ashok Sharma, and Sh. Surender Sangwan  with support  of local philanthropists. Sh. Parmender Chitoria has been the school's principal since its founding.

Arya Sr. Sec. School, Jhojhu Kalan owes its existence to the dream, vision and missionary zeal of  Sh. Parmender Chitoria, Sh. Kuldeep Sangwan, Sh. Ashok Sharma, Sh. Surender Sangwan.  A teacher by profession Sh. Parmender Chitoria shaped the destiny of this  institution from the last twelve formative years as its Principal.

Dedicated to the ideals and principles of the Indian sage and seer Swami Dayanand Saraswati, the school was founded in the  village of Jhojhu Kalan in the year 1996 with the support of local philanthropists.

The school is run by the Maharishi Dayanand Education Society which runs five educational institutions such as the Arya College of Education and the Arya College of Art. The school was ranked second in Haryana in 2002-03. In 2008, the first three toppers in Haryana were from Arya school. .

The school is situated on two campuses occupying  seven acres (five acres for the higher education and two acres for primary education). It gives instruction in streams including Arts, Science  (Medical, Non-Medical, Computer Science)

References

External links
Official website

High schools and secondary schools in Haryana
Schools in Bhiwani
Educational institutions established in 1996
1996 establishments in Haryana